Carlos Alcaraz defeated the defending champion Alexander Zverev in the final, 6–3, 6–1 to win the men's singles tennis title at the 2022 Madrid Open. Alcaraz also became the first man to defeat Rafael Nadal and Novak Djokovic in the same clay court tournament, which he did in the quarterfinals and semifinals, respectively.

Djokovic and Daniil Medvedev were in contention for the ATP No. 1 singles ranking. Djokovic retained the top ranking by reaching the third round. Djokovic became first player to record 30+ singles wins at all ATP Masters 1000.

Seeds
The top eight seeds received a bye into the second round.

Draw

Finals

Top half

Section 1

Section 2

Bottom half

Section 3

Section 4

Seeded players
The following are the seeded players based on the entry list per the ATP rankings as of 25 April 2022. The stated "rank" and "points before" are as of 2 May 2022.

As a result of special ranking adjustment rules due to the COVID-19 pandemic, players are defending the higher of (i) their points from the 2021 tournament or (ii) the remaining 50% of their points from the 2019 tournament. Those points were not mandatory and are included in the table below only if they counted towards the player's ranking as of 2 May 2022. Players who are not defending points from the 2021 or 2019 tournaments will instead have their 19th best result replaced by their points from the 2022 tournament.

† This column shows either (a) the higher of the player's points from the 2021 tournament or 50% of his points from the 2019 tournament, or (b) his 19th best result (shown in brackets). Only ranking points counting towards the player's ranking as of May 2, 2022, are reflected in the column.

Withdrawn players 
The following players would have been seeded, but withdrew before the tournament began.

Other entry information

Wildcards

Source:

Protected ranking

Withdrawals

Qualifying

Seeds

Qualifiers

Lucky loser
  Ugo Humbert

Draw

First qualifier

Second qualifier

Third qualifier

Fourth qualifier

Fifth qualifier

Sixth qualifier

Seventh qualifier

References

External links
 Main draw
 Qualifying draw

Singles men